Orosztony is a village in Zala County, in western Hungary.

External links 
 Street map 

Populated places in Zala County